
Year 132 BC was a year of the pre-Julian Roman calendar. At the time it was known as the Year of the Consulship of Laenas and Rupilius (or, less frequently, year 622 Ab urbe condita) and the Third Year of Yuanguang. The denomination 132 BC for this year has been used since the early medieval period, when the Anno Domini calendar era became the prevalent method in Europe for naming years.

Events 
 By place 
 Roman Republic 
 The First Servile War ends when Publius Rupilius quelled the rebellion.
 The assassination of Tiberius Gracchus, which many historians mark as the beginning of the end of the Roman Republic.

 Mexico 
 The Late Formative (or pre-Classic) period of the Maya civilization begins.

Births 
 Mithridates VI, king of Pontus (d. 63 BC)

Deaths 
 Eunus, leader of the Slave Revolt (136–132 BC) in Sicily
 Publius Cornelius Scipio Nasica Serapio, Roman consul
 Tiberius Gracchus, Roman tribune (assassinated by senators) (b. 168 BC)

References